Alexander Petrovich Karpinsky (trl. Aljeksandr Pjetrovič Karpinskij; 7 January 1847 (NS) – 15 July 1936) was a prominent Russian and Soviet geologist and mineralogist, and the president of the Russian Academy of Sciences, and later Academy of Sciences of the USSR, in 1917–1936.

Biography
Karpinsky was born in Turyinskiye Rudniki, Perm Governorate (now Krasnoturyinsk, Sverdlovsk Oblast), in the Ural Mountains, into a family of mining engineers. From 1857 to 1866 he studied at the mining school in St. Petersburg, and in 1863-1866 he also attended the Mineralogical Institute. From 1866 to 1869 he worked in his home area in the Urals as a mining engineer.

He was invited to the Mining Institute, St. Petersburg in 1869 as an Assistant Professor, whilst also doing further studies and research. He was given full professorship in 1877. He stayed there until 1885. He was the imperial director of mining research from 1885 to 1916.  Karpinsky was elected to the Russian Academy of Sciences in 1886, was elected its president in May 1917, and held this title until his death. His main research was chiefly done in the Ural Mountains, and he completed the first geological map of European Russia. He was able to preserve much scientific equipment and many invaluable records during the turmoil, and looting, of the Russian Revolution.

Karpinsky died on 15 July 1936 in Moscow, at the age of 89 and was cremated and an urn with his ashes lies in the Kremlin Wall Necropolis in Moscow, and is the oldest (by the date of birth) person to be so.

Publications

An Outline of Physical Geography of European Russia in Past Geological Periods
The General Character of the Changes in the Earth's Crust within the bounds of European Russia

Named in his honor
The mineral karpinskite
The lunar crater Karpinsky
The Karpinsky Group of volcanoes on Paramushir Island in the Kurils
Karpinsky Glacier, Severnaya Zemlya, Russian Arctic
Mount Karpinsky, Urals at 1878 m lies between the Tyumen Oblast and the Komi Republic in Russia
The town of Karpinsk, Sverdlovsk Oblast on the east side of the Urals
Karpinsky Russian Geology Research Institute
in 1947 (on the centenary of his birth) the Academy of Sciences of the USSR created the Karpinsky Gold Medal, awarded for outstanding contributions in the field of geology.

References

External links

 

1847 births
1936 deaths
People from Krasnoturyinsk
People from Verkhotursky Uyezd
Russian geologists
Russian mineralogists
Soviet geologists
Antarctic scientists
Full members of the Saint Petersburg Academy of Sciences
Full Members of the Russian Academy of Sciences (1917–1925)
Full Members of the USSR Academy of Sciences
Presidents of the USSR Academy of Sciences
Wollaston Medal winners
Burials at the Kremlin Wall Necropolis